This is a list of newspapers in Australia. For other older newspapers, see list of defunct newspapers of Australia.

National 
In 1950, the number of national daily newspapers in Australia was 54 and it increased to 65 in 1965.

Daily newspapers
 The Australian (broadsheet)
 The Australian Financial Review
 The Guardian Australia (online)
 The New Daily (online)

Weekly newspapers
 The Saturday Paper
 Green Left
 The Weekly Times

Bi-weekly and monthly newspapers
 Koori Mail, bi-weekly
 Nichigo Press national edition, monthly, Japanese
 The Life News national edition, fortnightly, English

New South Wales

Sydney and regional newspapers

There are many newspapers published in the State of New South Wales, serving both the capital, Sydney and the regions. Some newspapers are defunct; some have been renamed; some have been amalgamated. The two main Sydney newspapers are The Sydney Morning Herald, which was founded in 1831 when the state was still a colony, and The Daily Telegraph.

Broken Hill newspapers
Broken Hill, though a city in New South Wales, has significant historical SA connections.
 Barrier Daily Truth (1908– )
The Barrier Truth (1898–1908) - predecessor
 The Barrier Miner (1888–1974)
The Barrier Weekly Post (1898– )

Newspapers in languages other than English 

There are also many current and past newspapers serving local communities in New South Wales that are published in languages other than English.

Victoria

Statewide newspapers 
 VicNews

Melbourne newspapers 
 The Age (tabloid daily)
 Epoch Times (broadsheet Chinese weekly, subscription English weekly)
 Vision China Times (Chinese weekly)
 Herald Sun (tabloid daily)
 Leader Community Newspaper group publishes 33 local news titles covering metropolitan Melbourne
 Melbourne Observer (tabloid weekly)
 Sameway Magazine (Chinese weekly)
The Australian Jewish News (weekly)
 Viet Times (Vietnamese weekly) 
 Il Globo (bi-weekly, Italian)

Regional newspapers

 The Advertiser (Bairnsdale)
 Alexandra, Eildon, Marysville Standard
 Ararat Advertiser 
 Armstrong Creek Times 
 Bacchus Marsh Express
 Ballarat News
 Ballarat Times News Group
 The Bellarine Times
 Benalla Ensign
 Bendigo Advertiser
 The Bendigo Times
 The Bendigo Weekly
 The Border Mail (Wodonga)
 Brimbank Weekly
 The Camperdown Chronicle
 Casterton News
 Castlemaine Mail
 The Chronicle (Wangaratta)
 Cobram Courier
 Cohuna Farmer's Weekly
 Colac Herald
 Corryong Courier
 Country News (Shepparton)
 The Courier (Ballarat)
 Daylesford Advocate
 Dimboola Banner
 The Echo
 Euroa Gazette
 The Free Press
 The Geelong Advertiser
 The Geelong Times
 The Geelong News
 The Gippsland Times (Sale, Maffra and surrounding areas)
 Girgarre Gazette
 The Golden Plans Times (Golden Plans Shire)
 The Guardian (Swan Hill)
 Hamilton Spectator
 Healesville and Yarra Glen Guardian
 The Horsham Times
 Kyabram Free Press
 The Latrobe Valley Express (Latrobe Valley and surrounding areas)
 Marborough & Dunolly Advertiser
 Midland Express
 The Miner (Ballarat to Winchelsea)
 The Moe and Narracan News
 Moorabool News
 Mortlake Dispatch
 Morwell Advertiser
 Morwell and Yinnar Gazette
 Mount Wycheproof Ensign
 Murchison Advertiser
 Myrtleford Mail and Whorouly Witness
 Nagambie Times
 Narracan Shire Advocate
 Nathalia Herald
 Nhill Free Press
 The McIvor Times
 The North Central Review
 Ovens and Murray Advertiser
 Port Fairy Gazette
 The Portland Observer
 Riponshire Advocate
 Riverine Herald (Echuca)
 Rochester Express
 Romsey Express
 Rosedale Courier
 Rupunyup Spectator and Lubeck, Banyena, Rich Avon, and Lallat Advertiser
 Rutherglen Sun
 Shepparton Advertiser
 Shepparton News
 Snowy River Mail
 South Gippsland Voices Newspaper
 Sunraysia Daily (Mildura)
 Star News ( South East Suburbs)
 The Surfcoast Times (Surfcoast Shire)
 The Traralgon Journal
 Wangaratta Chronicle
 The Warragul & Drouin Gazette
 The Warragul Citizen
 The Warrnambool Standard
 The Weekly Times
 The Whittlesea Review
 Yea Chronicle

Queensland

Brisbane newspapers 
 Brisbane News (free weekly magazine)
 Brisbane Times (online)
 The Courier-Mail (tabloid)
 The Epoch Times (Broadsheet Chinese weekly, Subscription English weekly)
 The Catholic Leader (Brisbane)
 Newsbytes (online)
 Sameway Magazine (Chinese weekly)
 Queensland Asian Business Weekly (Chinese weekly)
 Queensland Country Life (published in Brisbane for Queensland rural readers)

Brisbane community newspapers 
 The Independent
 Quest Community Newspapers (city and suburban editions)
 The Reporter
 The Westerner
 Westside News
 Wynnum Herald
 Brisbane Indian Times
Made in India Magazine - Indian Magazine in Brisbane

Regional newspapers

 Albert & Logan News
 Ayr Advocate
 Balonne Beacon
 Beaudesert Times
 The Border Post (Stanthorpe)
 Bowen Independent
 Bundaberg NewsMail
 Caboolture Shire Herald
 Cairns Bulletin
 Cairns Newspapers
 Cairns Northern News
 The Cairns Post
 Cairns Sun
 The Canungra Times
 The Capricornian
 The Central & North Burnett Times
 Central Queensland News (Emerald)
 Central Queensland Today (Rockhampton)
 The Charleville Courier
 Chinchilla News and Murilla Advertiser
 The Chronicle
 Cooktown Local News
 The Daily Mercury
 Darling Downs Gazette
 The Evening Advocate

 The Gladstone Observer
 Gold Coast Bulletin
 Gold Coast Mail
 Gold Coast Sun
 Goondiwindi Argus
 Gympie Life
 Gympie Times
 Herbert River Express
 Hinterland Times
 Home Hill Observer
 Innisfail Advocate
 The Ipswich Herald and General Advertiser
 Ipswich News
 The Kuranda Paper
 Logan West Leader
 Longreach Leader
 The Maryborough Sun (Maryborough)
 The Morning Bulletin (Rockhampton)
 The Noosa Journal
 MacIntyre Gazette
 Moreton Daily News
 Noosa News
 The National Tribune
 Northern Herald (former Millstream Times)
 The Northern Miner (Charters Towers)
 Northern Times
 Pine Rivers Press
 Port Douglas and Mossman Gazette
 The Queensland Times (Ipswich)
 Redcliffe & Bayside Herald
 Redland City Bulletin
 South Burnett Times (Kingaroy)
 Southern Herald
 Sunshine Coast Daily
 Tablelander
 Tablelands Advertiser
 The Weekend Post
 The Whitsunday Times
 Toowoomba Chronicle
 Torres News
 Townsville Bulletin
 Townsville Sun
 Warwick Daily News
 Western Cape Bulletin
 The Western Star and Roma Advertiser
 Whitsunday Coast Guardian formerly The Proserpine Guardian and The Guardian
 Tropic Now
 The Coastal Rag (Discovery Coast, Queensland)

Western Australia

Perth newspapers 
 Countryman
 Fremantle Herald
 Subiaco Post
 The Sunday Times
 WA Business News
 The West Australian
Great Southern Weekender

Regional newspapers

 Albany Advertiser
 Avon Advocate
 Broome Advertiser
 The Bunbury Herald
 Bunbury Mail
 Busselton-Dunsborough Mail
 Busselton-Margaret Times
 Capes Herald
 Coolgardie Miner
 Darlington Review
 Esperance Express
  Echo Newspapers
 Geraldton Guardian
 Gnowangerup Star (defunct)
 Golden Age (Coolgardie daily)
 Goldfield Courier (Coolgardie)
 Goldfields Express (Goldfields region)
 Great Southern Herald (Katanning)
 Harvey Reporter
 Kalgoorlie Miner
 Kimberley Echo (Kununurra)
 Kimberley Times (Derby)
 Mandurah Coastal Times
 Mandurah Mail
 Manjimup-Bridgetown Times
 Midwest Times
 Mundaring Magazine
 Murray Mail (Pinjarra)
 Narrogin Observer
 North West Telegraph (Port Hedland)
 Northern Guardian (Carnarvon)
 The Northern Times (Carnarvon, W.A.)
 Northern Valleys News (Northern Valleys – Bindoon, Bullsbrook, Calingiri, Chittering, Gingin, Mogumber, Muchea, Wannamal)
 Pilbara Echo (Karratha, Dampier, Port Hedland)
 Pilbara News (Karratha)
 Pinjarra Murray Times (Pinjarra)
 Sound Telegraph (Rockingham)
 South Western Times (Bunbury)
 Southern Avon Chronicle (Northam, York)

South Australia

Adelaide 
 The Advertiser (tabloid)
 InDaily (online only)
 Messenger Newspapers
 Sameway Magazine (Chinese weekly)
 Stock Journal (statewide)
 The Southern Cross (Catholic weekly newspaper, now monthly)
 Sunday Mail (tabloid)

Regional newspapers

 The Border Chronicle (Bordertown)
 The Border Times (Pinnaroo)
 The Border Watch (Mount Gambier)
 The Bunyip (Gawler)
 Burra Broadcaster (Burra)
 Coastal Leader (Kingston SE)
 The Courier (Mount Barker)
 The Eyre Peninsula Tribune (Cleve)
 The Flinders News (Port Pirie)
 Gibber Gabber Herald (Tanunda)
   The Islander (Kingscote)
 The Leader (Barossa Valley)
 The Loxton News (Loxton)
 The Murray Pioneer (Renmark)
 The Murray Valley Standard (Murray Bridge)
 The Naracoorte Herald (Naracoorte)
 The Northern Argus (Clare Valley)
 On the Coast (Victor Harbor)
 The Pennant (Penola)
 The Plains Producer (Balaklava)
 The Port Lincoln Times (Port Lincoln)
 The Quorn Mercury (Quorn, Flinders Ranges)
 The Recorder (Port Pirie)
 The River News (Waikerie)
 The Southern Argus (Strathalbyn)
 South Eastern Times (Millicent)
 The Times (Victor Harbor)
 The Transcontinental (Port Augusta)
 Victor Harbor Times (Victor Harbor)
 The West Coast Sentinel (Ceduna)
 The Whyalla News (Whyalla)
 The York Peninsula Country Times (Kadina)

 Tasmania 

 Hobart newspapers 
 The Mercury The Sunday Tasmanian Regional newspapers 
 The Advocate (Burnie)
 Circular Head Chronicle (Smithton)
 The Examiner (Launceston)
 The Gazette (New Norfolk)
 Huon Valley News (Franklin)
 The Independent (Launceston)
 Kingborough Chronicle (Kingborough)
 North-Eastern Advertiser (Scottsdale)
 Tasmanian Country (Hobart)
 Sorell Times (Sorell)
 Tasman Gazette (Tasman peninsula)
 East Coast View (East coast)
 Hobart Observer (Hobart)
 Glenorchy Gazette (Glenorchy)
 Eastern Shore Sun (Eastern shore)

 Northern Territory 
 Darwin newspapers Darwin SunNorthern Territory News (1952–present)
 Palmerston SunRegional newspapers

 Alice Springs News Arafura Times Centralian Advocate 
 Eylandt Echo Katherine Times Litchfield Times Top End Review Wagaitear Australian Capital Territory 
 Canberra Weekly Canberra City News Canberra Illustrated: A Quarterly Magazine The Canberra Times 
 The Federal Capital Pioneer The Good Neighbour The RIOT ACT''

See also 
 Freedom of the press
 Jschool: Journalism Education & Training
 List of magazines in Australia
 List of newspapers in Australia by circulation
 List of student newspapers in Australia
 Media of Australia
 Media in Melbourne
 Media in Sydney
 Newspaper circulation
 Newspapers in Australia
 Photojournalism
 Printing

References

External links 
 ANPlan: The Australian Newspaper Plan – an initiative of Council of Australian State Libraries (CASL)
 Australian Newspapers Online. Try searching Libraries Australia (the Australian national bibliographic database) to see which Libraries in Australia carry which newspaper/s.
 Paperboy Australia: Australian newspapers listed by city and state